China's Li Ting and Sun Tiantian defeated Spain's Conchita Martínez and Virginia Ruano Pascual in the final, 6–3, 6–3 to win the gold medal in Women's Doubles tennis at the 2004 Summer Olympics. In the bronze medal match, Argentina's Paola Suárez and Patricia Tarabini defeated Japan's Shinobu Asagoe and Ai Sugiyama, 6–3, 6–3.

The tournament was held at the Olympic Tennis Centre in Athens, Greece. 64 competitors (32 teams) from 22 countries participated.

Serena Williams and Venus Williams were the reigning gold medalists, but Serena chose not to participate. Venus partnered with Chanda Rubin for the United States, but the pair lost in the first round to future winners Li and Sun.

Medalists

Seeds

Draw

Finals

Top half

Bottom half

References
ITF Olympic Site

2004

Women's Doubles
2004 in women's tennis
Women's events at the 2004 Summer Olympics